Holly Grove may refer to:

Places

United States
 Holly Grove, Arkansas, a town
Holly Grove Historic District, Holly Grove, Arkansas, listed on the NRHP in Monroe County, Arkansas
Holly Grove, Davidson County, North Carolina, an unincorporated community
Holly Grove, Gates County, North Carolina, an unincorporated communities
Holly Grove, West Virginia, an unincorporated community
Holly Grove Methodist Church, Anacoco, Louisiana, listed on the NRHP in Vernon Parish, Louisiana
Holly Grove (Clinton, Louisiana), listed on the NRHP in East Feliciana Parish, Louisiana
Holly Grove Plantation House, Bolton, Mississippi, NRHP-listed
Holly Grove (Centreville, Mississippi), listed on the NRHP in Wilkinson County, Mississippi
Holly Grove Site, Sledge, Mississippi, NRHP-listed
Holly Grove Mansion, Charleston, West Virginia, listed on the NRHP in West Virginia

See also
Hollygrove (disambiguation)
Holly Grove School (disambiguation)